Amna Mawaz Khan (Born: July 22, 1989) is a Pakistani classical dancer of Bharatnatyam, theatre artist, feminist and political worker. She is founding member of Women Democratic Front.

Early life and education
Khan was born in Rawalpindi on 22 July 1989. She got her early education from Khaldunia High School, Islamabad. She completed her bachelor's degree in arts from University of the Punjab. She studied her master's degree in Pakistan studies in 2013 from National Institute of Pakistan Studies, Quaid-i-Azam University Islamabad.

Bharatanatyam Dance
Khan began classical dance learning at the age of 11 from renowned dancer Indu Mitha in her school, Mazmoon-e-Shauq and learnt from her for 11 years. After that, she started teaching dance for six years. Khan also did a short course in contemporary dance and choreography from Trinity Laban Conservatoire in Greenwich, London, England.

From 2016 to 2018, Khan worked as dance instructor and head choreographer of the permanent dance ensemble, the National Performing Arts Group, at the Pakistan National Council of Arts, Islamabad. Khan aims to preserve this rare classical dance in the country and pass the art on to others.

Khan has also learnt and explored Kathak, Uday Shankar's style of dance and Pakistani folk dances. She has performed and given workshops across Pakistan as well as in America, China, India, Switzerland and the United Kingdom. She has performed on various occasions with Tehreema Mitha (daughter of Indu Mitha), who is also a renowned classical dancer, living in USA. Khan has performed her dance in many art and literature festivals. Khan was featured in a documentary "How She Moves" which was displayed in Portland Film Festival.

She wrote a perspective "Raqs-e-Mahavaari" in the book "Period Matters: Menstruation in South Asia" written by Farah Ahamed with expressions through Bharatanatyam choreography and its genesis.

Theatre Artist
Khan is a peace and social activist and a feminist. She helped in making of the socialist, progressive art collective Laal Hartaal. She performed on various occasions with members of Laal Hartaal in Women Marches, Student Marches, Art festivals, Faiz Amn Mela. and climate action day event.

Khan often works with the Pakistan National Council of the Arts, Theatrewallay and Kuch Khaas in their creative productions.

She is a member of the Magdalena Project which facilitates support and training to cross-cultural network of women’s theatre and performance. She curated the exhibition "Peepal and Banyan" in Berlin, featuring the work of contemporary artists from Pakistan.

Political Worker
Khan is also a left wing political worker. Her activism began in 2007, during the emergency imposed under dictatorship, she was a student then. She mobilized students for protest demonstrations, wrote, acted and directed for street theatre. She joined the Awami Workers Party in 2012 when it was founded. Since then, Khan has been active in campaigns for release of progressive political prisoners and movements on housing rights, women issues, students, transgenders, peasants and minorities. Khan also stood in the local body elections of Islamabad in 2015 as Awami Workers Party’s (AWP) candidate for vice chairman in UC-28. Since 2007, Khan is working as political organizer and a feminist.

She is founding member of Women Democratic Front, a feminist, socialist organization.

In March, 2016 she also delivered a TED talk on "Identification and rectification of socially constructed barriers" in Islamabad.

Notable works
Jathiswaram Duet
Dukhi
A Perception (2015): Short drama, directed and written by Hassan Ahmed Raja
:  Kishwar Naheed’s well known satirical poem, ‘’ (we sinful women) in honour of women who struggle every day against the injustices and oppression of a patriarchal society; an affirmation of the beauty; strength and power of womanhood.
, ‘in the hope of a new beginning where everything is encompassed by love.
Barzakh
Situation 101
Mehergarh
 :  based on Habib Jalib’s poem Zulm rahe aur amn bhi ho, paying homage to Mashal.
Niqab 
 Featured in How She Moves (2018): Documentary, a tribute to Indu Mitha
Teen Taal: Based on Malkauns raga dates back to Emperor Akbar’s court. The performance with technical dance, called Alarippu in multiple styles of manipuri, khattak and bharatnatyam, is considered the foundation of bharatnatyam taught to every student.
’ (A thousands yearnings)
Jaal: organized by Kuch Khas
Saavan
Aamad
Ae Ri Sakhi

When All of This is Over
Azad Aurat: Poem by Rubina Ahmed

Saans Lenay Do
no man's land

External links
Her Website
Dance showreel
BBC URDU's report on Amna Mawaz Khan

References

Pakistani humanists
Pakistani feminists
Feminism in Pakistan
Living people
Pakistani choreographers
Pakistani female dancers
Pakistani music educators
Dance teachers
Bharatanatyam exponents
Pakistani women
Teachers of Indian classical dance
Year of birth missing (living people)